Cyanoalanine (more accurately β-Cyano-L-alanine) is an amino acid with the formula NCCH2CH(NH2)CO2H.  Like most amino acids, it exists as a tautomer NCCH2CH(NH3+)CO2−. It is a rare example of a nitrile-containing amino acid. It is a white, water-soluble solid. It can be found in common vetch seeds.

Cyanoalanine arises in nature by the action of cyanide on cysteine catalyzed by L-3-cyanoalanine synthase:
HSCH2CH(NH2)CO2H  +  HCN  →  NCCH2CH(NH2)CO2H  +  H2S

It is converted to aspartic acid and asparagine enzymatically.

References

Amino acids
Nitriles